Chanthaburi (Chong:  chankabui) is one of seven provinces (changwat) in eastern Thailand, on the border with Battambang and Pailin of Cambodia, on the shore of the Gulf of Thailand. Neighbouring provinces are Trat in the east and Rayong, Chonburi, Chachoengsao, and Sa Kaeo to the west and north.

History 

The indigenous people of the Chantaburi region are the Chong. The Chong have lived in the area since the Ayutthaya Kingdom, and are thought to have been early inhabitants of Cambodia, possibly pre-dating the Khmer. In Chantaburi province, the Chong predominantly inhabit the districts of Khao Khitchakut, Pong Nam Ron, and Makham.

After the Paknam crisis in 1893, French colonial troops occupied Chanthaburi, returning it in 1905 when Thailand gave up ownership of the western part of Cambodia. A significant minority of Chanthaburi citizens are ethnic Vietnamese, who came there in three waves: first in the 19th century during anti-Catholic persecutions in Cochin China; a second wave in the 1920s to 1940s fleeing French Indochina; and a third wave after the communist victory in Vietnam in 1975. The town of Chanthaburi has been the seat of a Bishop of Chanthaburi since 1944.

Chanthaburi once used to be an important source of gemstones, especially rubies and sapphires. While the Chantaboon Waterfront Community was developed over three centuries ago during the reign of King Narai along the banks of the River Mae Nam Chantaburi. It was an essential transportation and trade hub. Over the years, the Chantaboon Waterfront Community had lost its sheen. However, in the recent decade, the locals with the help of Thai officials have contributed to its revival as a major destination for cultural tourism.

Geography 

While the southern part of the province is on the shore of the Gulf of Thailand and thus is mostly coastal alluvial plains, the interior of the province is mountainous. The Chanthaburi Mountains in the north has the highest elevation in the province, the 1,675 m high Khao Soi Dao Tai peak. The main river of the province is the Chanthaburi River.
Together with the neighboring province, Trat, Chanthaburi is a center of gemstone mining, especially rubies and sapphires. Tropical fruits are also among the main products of the province. In 2000, it produced nearly 380,000 tonnes of durian, which was 45.57 percent of Thailand's durian production, approximately 27 percent of the entire world's production.

National parks
There area four national parks, along with three other national parks, make up region 2 (Si Racha) of Thailand's protected areas. 
 Namtok Phlio National Park, 
 Khao Sip Ha Chan National Park, 
 Khao Chamao–Khao Wong National Park, 
 Khao Khitchakut National Park,

Wildlife sanctuaries
There are three wildlife sanctuaries, along with one other wildlife sanctuary, make up region 2 (Si Racha) of Thailand's protected areas. 
 Khao Ang Rue Nai Wildlife Sanctuary, 
 Khao Soi Dao Wildlife Sanctuary, 
 Khlong Kruea Wai Wildlife Sanctuary,

Symbols 
The provincial seal shows the moon surrounded by an aura. Inside the moon disc is a rabbit, as in Thai folklore the dark areas on the moon (maria) form the shape of a rabbit. The seal symbolizes the peace and tranquility of the province. The moon also refers to the meaning of the province, "City of Moon", from Chantha- (lit. 'moon') and buri (lit. 'city').

The flag of the province also shows the seal in the middle, a white rabbit on a yellow moon disc, on a blue disc. The background of the flag is red, with the name of province in yellow written below the seal.

The provincial tree is Diospyros decandra. The provincial flower is an orchid (Dendrobium friedericksianum). The brackish water fish flagfin prawn goby (Mahidolia mystacina) is the provincial fish.

The provincial slogan is "Magnificent waterfalls, fruit city, good breeding peppercorns, loads of gems, Chanthabun mat, fertile nature, gathering place of King Taksin the Great's Liberation Army".

Administrative divisions

Provincial government
The province is divided into 10 districts (amphoes). These are further subdivided into 76 subdistricts (tambons) and 690 villages (mubans).
 Mueang Chanthaburi
 Khlung
 Tha Mai
 Pong Nam Ron
 Makham
 Laem Sing
 Soi Dao
 Kaeng Hang Maeo
 Na Yai Am
 Khao Khitchakut

Local government
As of 26 November 2019 there are: one Chanthaburi Provincial Administration Organisation and 47 municipal areas in the province. Chanthaburi, Chanthanimit, Khlung, Tha Chang and Tha Mai have town status. Further 42 subdistrict municipalities (thesaban tambon). The non-municipal areas are administered by 34 Subdistrict Administrative Organisations - SAO.

Transportation

Roads
Route 3 (Sukhumvit Road) passes near Chanthaburi and connects to Rayong, Pattaya, Chonburi, and Bangkok to the northwest and Trat to the southeast. Route 317 connects Chanthaburi to Sa Kaeo.

Air
There is no airport in Chantaburi. The nearest airport is Trat Airport, 66 km from the center of Chanthaburi.

Human achievement index 2017

Since 2003, United Nations Development Programme (UNDP) in Thailand has tracked progress on human development at sub-national level using the Human achievement index (HAI), a composite index covering all the eight key areas of human development. National Economic and Social Development Board (NESDB) has taken over this task since 2017.

Health 
Chanthaburi's main hospital is Prapokklao Hospital, operated by the Ministry of Public Health.

Local food
Mu chamuang (หมูชะมวง): a curry is made from pork belly, herbs and sour grape apple shimba Chamuang (Garcinia cowa) leaves which is a popular dish of Chanthaburi and other provinces in eastern region.
Kuaytiew mu liang (ก๋วยเตี๋ยว​หมูเลี้ยง): stewed pork noodles in Rĕw (Amomum villosum) herbal thicken soup which is unique local food.
Khanom khuai ling (ขนมควยลิง): traditional dessert of Chanthaburi with a long history, its name literally means "monkey's dick snack".
Kuaytiew sen chan pad pu (ก๋วยเตี๋ยวเส้นจันท์ผัดปู): a kind of Pad thai that uses Chanthaburi's rice noodles stir-fried with crab meat.

References

External links 

 
Provinces of Thailand
Gulf of Thailand